Giuseppe Baldini (1807 – 1876) was an Italian painter, specializing in portraits, landscapes, and religious subjects, born in Livorno where he worked most of his life.

Biography
He studied at the Accademia di San Luca in Rome. Among his pupils were a young Giovanni Fattori and Giovanni Costa. Among his works are portraits of  Capitan Lavarello and S. Pediani, Signora Baluganti; and his Figlio Eugenio. For the church of San Giuseppe, Livorno, he painted Jesus gives the keys to St Peter; Martyrdom of Sts Crispin and Crispiniano; and  Jesus at Prayer in the Orchard.

References

1807 births
1876 deaths
19th-century Italian painters
Italian male painters
Painters from Tuscany
19th-century Italian male artists